Janet Cooper Alexander is an American lawyer who is currently the Frederick I. Richman Professor of Law Emerita at Stanford Law School.

Career
Alexander graduated with a Bachelor of Arts in English Literature with distinction from Swarthmore College in 1968. In 1973, she received a Master of Arts in English from Stanford University, and a Juris Doctor from the University California, Berkeley Law School in 1978. She then served as a law clerk to Judge Shirley M. Hufstedler of the United States Court of Appeals for the Ninth Circuit from 1978 to 1979, and to Justice Thurgood Marshall of the United States Supreme Court from 1979 to 1980.

Following her clerkships, she practiced law at Califano, Ross & Heineman in Washington, D.C. from 1980 to 1982, and then for five years at Morrison & Foerster in San Francisco, California, where she was a partner, 1984–1987.

In 1987, Alexander accepted a position as associate professor at Stanford Law School. She became a professor in 1994, and since 2002 has held the Frederick I. Richman chair.

See also
 List of law clerks of the Supreme Court of the United States (Seat 10)

References

Selected publications

 

1946 births
Living people
Swarthmore College alumni
Stanford University School of Humanities and Sciences alumni
UC Berkeley School of Law alumni
American legal scholars
Law clerks of the Supreme Court of the United States
Stanford Law School faculty
20th-century American lawyers
21st-century American lawyers
American scholars of constitutional law
American women academics
21st-century American women
People associated with Morrison & Foerster